The Buru monarch (Symposiachrus loricatus) is a species of bird in the family Monarchidae. It is endemic to Indonesia.

Taxonomy and systematics
This species was formerly placed in the genus Monarcha until moved to Symposiachrus in 2009. Some authorities have considered the black-tipped monarch to be a subspecies of the Kai monarch. Alternate names include Buru Island monarch and black-tipped monarch.

Distribution and habitat
The Buru monarch is found in the southern Moluccas. Its natural habitats are subtropical or tropical moist lowland forests and subtropical or tropical moist montane forests.

Status
The species occupy an area of larger than 20,000 km2 and have a stable population of above 10,000, and thus are not considered as threatened.

References

Buru monarch
Birds of Buru
Buru monarch
Taxonomy articles created by Polbot